Bedford Borough Council is the local authority for the unitary authority of Bedford in Bedfordshire, England. Until 1 April 2009 it was a non-metropolitan district. Since 2002 it has also had a directly elected mayor.

Political control

Borough council
Since the first election to the council in 1973 political control of the council has been held by the following parties:

Non-metropolitan district

Unitary authority

Directly elected mayor
The directly-elected mayors of Bedford since 2002 have been:

Council elections

Non-metropolitan district elections
1973 Bedford District Council election
1976 North Bedfordshire Borough Council election
1979 North Bedfordshire Borough Council election
1983 North Bedfordshire Borough Council election (New ward boundaries)
1984 North Bedfordshire Borough Council election
1986 North Bedfordshire Borough Council election
1987 North Bedfordshire Borough Council election
1988 North Bedfordshire Borough Council election
1990 North Bedfordshire Borough Council election
1991 North Bedfordshire Borough Council election (Borough boundary changes took place but the number of seats remained the same)
1992 Bedford Borough Council election
1994 Bedford Borough Council election
1995 Bedford Borough Council election
1996 Bedford Borough Council election
1998 Bedford Borough Council election
1999 Bedford Borough Council election
2000 Bedford Borough Council election
2002 Bedford Borough Council election (New ward boundaries)
2003 Bedford Borough Council election
2004 Bedford Borough Council election
2006 Bedford Borough Council election
2007 Bedford Borough Council election

Unitary authority elections
2009 Bedford Borough Council election
2011 Bedford Borough Council election (New ward boundaries)
2015 Bedford Borough Council election
2019 Bedford Borough Council election

Mayoral elections
Bedford held a referendum on 21 February 2002 on whether to introduce a directly elected mayor after a petition was signed by at least 5% of the electorate. The move was approved with 11,316 voting in favour and 5,357 against on a turnout of 15.5%. The first mayoral election on 17 October 2002 saw independent Frank Branston elected as mayor.

2007
In 2007 Frank Branston was re-elected as mayor.

¹Using the Supplementary Vote system.

²Percentage figures are not officially used on the final votes, they are produced here for illustration and are calculated by the candidates final vote divided by the total of final votes.

2009
A by-election for Mayor of Bedford took place on 15 October 2009 after the death of the previous incumbent, Frank Branston in August 2009. The election was won by the Liberal Democrat, Dave Hodgson.

2011 Bedford mayoral election

By-election results

European Union Membership Referendum 2016
The electorate of Bedford Borough voted by a margin of 51.8% to 48.2% (on a 72.1% turnout) to leave the European Union during the 2016 United Kingdom European Union membership referendum (reflecting the national picture). The Kingsbrook ward voted most heavily in favour of Leave (60.71%), while the Queen's Park ward voted most strongly for Remain (57.66%). Other areas of Bedford to favour Remain were Bromham and Biddenham, Castle, De Parys, Harpur, Kempston Rural, Newnham, Oakley and Sharnbrook.

References

External links
Bedford Borough Council

 
Politics of the Borough of Bedford
Council elections in Bedfordshire
Unitary authority elections in England